Deep Creek is a  long 2nd order tributary to the Appoquinimink River in New Castle County, Delaware.

Variant names
According to the Geographic Names Information System, it has also been known historically as:  
North Appoquinimink River

Course
Deep Creek rises on the Bohemia River divide about 1 mile southwest of Middletown in New Castle County, Delaware.  Deep Creek then flows east to meet the Appoquinimink River about 1.5 miles southwest of Odessa, Delaware.

Watershed
Deep Creek drains  of area, receives about 43.2 in/year of precipitation, has a topographic wetness index of 632.96 and is about 2.5% forested.

See also
List of rivers of Delaware

References 

Rivers of Delaware
Rivers of New Castle County, Delaware